Jón Bjarnason (born 26 December 1943) is a former member of parliament of the Althing, the Icelandic parliament from 1999 to 2013.  An agronomist by training, he served as Minister of Fisheries and Agriculture in the years 2009–2011.

He is a former member of the Left-Green Movement. In 2013 he was a co-founder of Rainbow, a new eurosceptic political party. He did not get reelected in the 2013 parliamentary election.

External links
Althing biography

Living people
1943 births
Jon Bjarnason
Jon Bjarnason
Jon Bjarnason
Jon Bjarnason